Translationally Controlled Tumor Protein (TCTP) is a protein that in humans is encoded by the TPT1 gene. The TPT1 gene is mapped  13q12-q1413 in the Chromosome 13. The human gene contains five introns and six exons, The TPT1-gene contains a promoter with a canonical TATA-box and several promoter elements, which are well-conserved in mammals.  The assay with reporter gene exhibits a strong promoter activity comparable to viral promoters.

TCTP protein is also referred to as Q23, P21, P23, histamine releasing factor (HRF), and fortilin. TCTP is a multifunctional and highly conserved protein that existed ubiquitously in different eukaryote species and distributed widely in various tissues and cell types.

Human translationally controlled tumor protein (hTCTP) is a growth-related, calcium-binding protein.

History 

Translationally controlled tumor protein was first discovered in 1989 as a cDNA sequence obtained from a human mammary carcinoma cDNA library with proves derived from the translationally controlled, growth-related mouse tumor protein TCTP. TCTP was originally described as a growth related protein of tumor cells. Its mRNA accumulates in translationally repressed postpolysomal mRNP-complexes.

Research in 1997 shown that TCTP is not a tumor- or tissue-specific protein, but is expressed ubiquitously from plants to mammals.

Characteristics   
TCTP is a 20–25 kDa protein abundantly and ubiquitously expressed in  the cell. The protein is transcribed in more than 500 different tissues and cell types; hTCTP gene is one of the top 10 most ubiquitously expressed genes in humans by examining 1753 libraries from kinds of tissues, but differed considerably in their quantity and ratio of expression. The expression is lower in kidney and renal cells. This indicates an extensive transcriptional control and involvement of tissue-specific factors.

The majority of publications established TCTP to be a cytoplasmic protein but nuclear localisation has also been reported, as well as extracellular activity; however, the process of secretion has not been found.

Function 
The abundance and ubiquity indicate that TCTP may have important primary functions. However, a large number of cellular and biochemical functions have been found since 1980s. Most of these functions can be classified into three groups.

Growth-related 

TCTP has properties of a tubulin binding protein that associates with microtubules in a cell cycle-dependent manner.

The transient overexpression of TCTP in HeLa cells prevented them from undergoing etoposide-induced apoptosis. Expressing TCTP in U2OS (human bone osteosarcoma epithelial cells) protected them  from cell death induced by etoposide over various concentrations and durations of exposure. TCTP overexpression inhibited caspase-3-like activity as assessed by the cleavage of fluorogenic substrate.

Expression levels of TCTP were down-regulated at the mRNA and protein levels during tumor suppression and by the activation of p53 and Siah-1 very well known anti-tumor genes. Down-regulation of TCTP can induce tumor reversion, and in combination with some drugs that decrease the level of TCTP and will lead to kill tumor cells. TCTP knockdown in primary mammary tumor cells, results in increased p53 expression and a decreased number of stem-like cancer cells.

Reducing TCTP (dTCTP) levels in Drosophila reduces cell size, cell number and organ size, which mimics Drosophila Rheb (dRheb) mutant phenotypes; human TCTP (hTCTP) shows similar biochemical properties compared to dTCTP.

Immunity-related 

TCTP caused histamine release from the human basophils of a subpopulation of donors, and this release was dependent on IgE.
The expression of TCTP is regulated at two distinct levels, depletion of the ER calcium causes an increase in TCTP mRNA abundance, increased cytosolic calcium concentrations regulate gene expression at the post-transcriptional level.

Downregulation of the protein levels by siRNA in HTR-8/SVneo (Homo sapiens placenta cells) was associated with a reduced cellular calcium-uptake activity and buffering capacity.

Cancer-related 
Translationally-controlled tumor protein has a role in tumor reversion and development.

Translationally Controlled Tumor Protein (TCTP/tpt1) is a regulator of the cancer stem cell compartment, the tumor reversion, tumor progression and certain forms of inflammatory diseases. Moreover, TCTP was described as a pro-survival protein antagonizing BAX function.

Structure 
Sequence alignment of TCTP sequences from more than 30 different species reveals a high degree of conservation over a long period of evolution.

The solution structure of TCTP from yeast, Schizosaccharomyces pombe has been determined by NMR spectroscopy which indicated that this protein is structurally similar to two small guanine nucleotide-free chaperones, namely Mss4 and Dss4. TCTP and Mss4/Dss4 are now therefore structurally grouped into one protein superfamily.

Translationally Controlled Tumor Protein (TCTP) is involved in a wide range of molecular interactions with biological and nonbiological partners of various chemical compositions such as proteins, peptides, nucleic acids, carbohydrates, or small molecules. TCTP is therefore an important and versatile binding platform. Many of these protein–protein interactions have been validated, albeit only few received an in-depth structural characterization. In TCTP/tpt1 - Remodeling Signaling from Stem Cell to Disease,  focus is on the structural analysis of TCTP and the review of the available literature regarding its interaction network from a structural perspective.

Interactions 
TCTP has been shown to interact with:
 Bax, Bcl-2-associated X protein
 Mcl-1
 Bcl-xL

References

Further reading

External links